Otto Löble (27 October 1888 – 29 May 1967) was a German international footballer.

References

1888 births
1967 deaths
Association football forwards
German footballers
Germany international footballers
Stuttgarter Kickers players